FC Valga Warrior is a football club based in Valga, Estonia.

The club joined with FC Valga at the end of 2005 and got their place in Meistriliiga.

They finished 8th in the Esiliiga in 2010 accumulating 35 points in 36 games.
After promotion/relegation play-offs they lost to Tallinna FC Atletik, and were relegated to II E/N, third level of Estonian club football.

Statistics

League and Cup

Notable former players

References

 
Warrior Valga
Warrior Valga
1997 establishments in Estonia
Sport in Valga, Estonia
Association football clubs established in 1997